Terrance Richard Duff (born February 18, 1936) is a Canadian former professional ice hockey forward who played 18 seasons for the Toronto Maple Leafs, Montreal Canadiens, Buffalo Sabres, Los Angeles Kings, and New York Rangers in the National Hockey League (NHL) between 1955 and 1971. He also served as head coach of the Leafs for part of the 1979–80 season. At a height of 5 feet and ten inches, weighing 163 pounds, he was considered one of the best small players of his generation.

Playing career
Duff was born in Kirkland Lake, Ontario in 1936 to a family of 13 brothers and sisters. Growing up playing hockey with his brothers, Duff pursued the sport full-time at the age of 15. Duff moved to Toronto to attend St. Michael's College School and play hockey for the school affiliated team, now known as the Toronto St. Michael's Majors. After establishing himself as a scorer during his two years at the school (1953-1955), Duff was invited to play his first NHL game in 1955; a scoreless game between the Montreal Canadiens and the Toronto Maple Leafs. Duff surrendered his final year of junior eligibility to sign with the team for the 1956-57 season.

Duff won six Stanley Cups, two with Toronto and four with Montreal. On November 13, 2006 he was inducted into Hockey Hall of Fame. In 2014, he was inducted into the Ontario Sports Hall of Fame.

His brother Les Duff played professional ice hockey. A great-nephew Cody Goloubef, has played in the NHL.

Career statistics

Regular season and playoffs

Coaching record

Achievements
1962 Stanley Cup Champion (with Toronto)
1963 Stanley Cup Champion (with Toronto)
1965 Stanley Cup Champion (with Montreal)
1966 Stanley Cup Champion (with Montreal)
1968 Stanley Cup Champion (with Montreal)
1969 Stanley Cup Champion (with Montreal)

See also 
 List of NHL players with 1000 games played

References

External links

1936 births
Living people
Buffalo Sabres players
Canadian ice hockey left wingers
Hockey Hall of Fame inductees
Ice hockey people from Ontario
Los Angeles Kings players
Montreal Canadiens players
New York Rangers players
Sportspeople from Kirkland Lake
Stanley Cup champions
Toronto Maple Leafs players
Toronto Maple Leafs coaches
Toronto St. Michael's Majors players